Leonid Brezhnev (1906–1982) was a Soviet politician.

Brezhnev may also refer to:
Brezhnev (surname), including a list of other people with this last name
Brezhnev (film), a 2005 biographical film about Leonid Brezhnev
Brezhnev, former name of Naberezhnye Chelny, Russia